The 2016 Ohio Valley Conference baseball tournament will be held from May 25 through 29.  The top six regular season finishers will meet in the double-elimination tournament, to be held at Pringles Park in Jackson, Tennessee.  The tournament champion will earn the conference's automatic bid to the 2016 NCAA Division I baseball tournament  Among current members, Austin Peay has won the most championships, with six, while Belmont (joined in 2012), SIU Edwardsville (joined in 2008),and Tennessee–Martin (joined in 1992) have never won championships.  The Tournament began in 1979.

Seeding and format
The top six regular season finishers will be seeded by conference winning percentage.  Teams will then play a double-elimination tournament, with the top two seeds receiving a single bye.  Austin Peay vacated four wins from the season, making their record 17–9  for conference purposes, and dropping them to the third seed.

Results

References

Tournament
Ohio Valley Conference Baseball Tournament
Ohio Valley Conference baseball tournament
Ohio Valley Conference baseball tournament
Baseball in Tennessee
Sports in Jackson, Tennessee